Streptomyces geldanamycininus is a bacterium species from the genus of Streptomyces. Streptomyces geldanamycininus produces geldanamycin.

See also 
 List of Streptomyces species

References

Further reading

External links
Type strain of Streptomyces geldanamycininus at BacDive – the Bacterial Diversity Metadatabase

geldanamycininus
Bacteria described in 2008